Běla is female given name of Czech origin, meaning white, clear. That's Czech form of Italian name Bianca and German name Blanka. Pronounced byeh-lah.

Name Days 
Czech: 21 January

Famous bearers 
Bjela Hrabková
Běla Kolářová, Czech artist and photographer
Běla Šarayová, Czech model
Běla Fialová, Czech photographer
Běla Hlaváčková, Czech swimmer
Běla Hejná, Czech politician and medicine doctor
Běla Jurdová, Czech actress
Běla Gran Jensen
Běla Sochorová, Czech breeder

See also
Béla, masculine given name of Hungarian origin

References 
Miloslava Knappová, PhDr.

External links 
Christian name.cz
BĚLA @ Behind the Name

Czech feminine given names